Whittaker Memorial Hospital is a historic hospital building located in the Brookville Heights neighborhood in the East End of Newport News, Virginia. The original section was built in 1943 with additions in 1957 and 1966. The earliest portion of the building has a symmetrical "T"-plan with both Moderne and Art Deco influences. It has a concrete frame, with concrete roof and floor slabs, and curtain walls constructed of alternating bands of yellow and brown bricks. The central mass is three stories tall and has two-story wings.  The Whittaker Memorial Hospital was founded in 1908 to serve the African-American population of Newport News. The hospital was built by African-American physicians and designed by African-American architects. It was originally housed in the James A. Fields House, then in a frame hospital built in 1915 before this building was constructed in 1943. The hospital closed in 1985.

It was listed on the National Register of Historic Places in 2009.

References

Hospital buildings completed in 1943
Hospital buildings completed in 1957
Hospital buildings completed in 1966
African-American history of Virginia
Hospital buildings on the National Register of Historic Places in Virginia
Moderne architecture in Virginia
Art Deco architecture in Virginia
Buildings and structures in Newport News, Virginia
National Register of Historic Places in Newport News, Virginia